Albert L. Reeves (December 21, 1873 – March 24, 1971) was a United States district judge of the United States District Court for the Western District of Missouri.

Education and career

Born in Steelville, Missouri, Reeves received an Artium Baccalaureus degree from Steelville College in 1898 and read law in 1899. He entered private practice in Steelville in 1899, later moving his practice to Kansas City, Missouri. He was a member of the Missouri House of Representatives from 1901 to 1902. He was counsel to the Missouri State Insurance Department from 1909 to 1913, and a member of the State Civil Service Commission in Kansas City from 1916 to 1917. He was a commissioner for the Supreme Court of Missouri from 1921 to 1923. He was also a lecturer at the Kansas City Dental College and at the Kansas City School of Law (now the University of Missouri–Kansas City School of Law).

Federal judicial service

Reeves was nominated by President Warren G. Harding on January 16, 1923, to the United States District Court for the Western District of Missouri, to a new seat authorized by 42 Stat. 837. He was confirmed by the United States Senate on January 24, 1923, and received his commission the same day. He served as Chief Judge from 1948 to 1954. He assumed senior status on February 2, 1954. His service terminated on March 24, 1971, due to his death in Dunedin, Florida.

See also
 List of United States federal judges by longevity of service

References

Sources
 

1873 births
1971 deaths
People from Crawford County, Missouri
Members of the Missouri House of Representatives
Judges of the United States District Court for the Western District of Missouri
United States district court judges appointed by Warren G. Harding
20th-century American judges
United States federal judges admitted to the practice of law by reading law